Ornithia mexicana is a species of beetle in the family Cerambycidae. It is the only species of the genus Ornithia . It was described by Sturm in 1843.

References

Cerambycinae
Beetles described in 1843
Monotypic beetle genera